The 1931 San Diego Marine Devil Dogs football team represented the Marine Corps Recruit Depot San Diego during the 1931 football season.  The Devil Dogs compiled a 6–4 record against a schedule of local and collegiate teams, and outscored their opponents by a total of 120 to 110 or 111.

Schedule

References

San Diego Marines Devil Dogs
San Diego Marines